Roerichiora clara is a species of moth of the family Cossidae. It is found in India, Nepal, Bhutan, Myanmar and Vietnam.

References

Moths described in 1950
Zeuzerinae